Bichiwara Tehsil is one of five tehsils in Dungarpur District of Rajasthan, India. It is in the western part of the district and borders on Gujarat. The village of Bichhiwara is the headquarters of the tehsil.

Bichiwara Tehsil is bounded by Kherwara Tehsil, of Udaipur District, to the northwest and north, by Dungarpur Tehsil to the east, by Simalwara Tehsil to the southeast, and by Meghraj Taluka and Bhiloda Taluka, both of Gujarat, to the southwest and west.  It averages  in elevation.

In the 2015 panchayat samiti election the seats were split pretty evenly between the Congress Party (14 seats) and the BJP (11 seats).

Towns and Villages
Bichiwara Tehsil has no towns. It has forty-eight panchayat villages.

Notes and references

Dungarpur district
Tehsils of Rajasthan